Paolo Antonio Gualdo Lodrini (23 December 1716 – circa 1784) was an Italian painter, mainly active in Bergamo as a painter of sacred subjects during the Rococo or late-Baroque period.

Biography
He was born in Nembro, near Bergamo, and trained painting portraits under Fra Galgario. After five years he moved to Rome, where he worked under Placido Costanzi, a pupil of Benedetto Luti. Returning to Bergamo, he painted altarpieces for a number of churches in the region, including: the Chiesa del Carmine, Bergamo; the parish church of Alzano Lombardo; the parish church of Bonate Sopra; the parish church of Spirano; the parish church of Colognola; the church of Bariano; and for the bishop's chapel in  Fara in Gerra d’Adda.

Note
Another painter named Pietro Gualdi was born in 1808 in Carpi in the region of Emilia-Romagna, but practiced as a panorama painter, architect and lithographer who was active in Mexico City from 1838 to about 1851, and in New Orleans from about 1851 to 1857.

References

1716 births
1784 deaths
18th-century Italian painters
Italian male painters
Painters from Bergamo
Italian Baroque painters
18th-century Italian male artists